John Seddon is a British psychologist.

John Seddon may also refer to:

John Seddon (politician) (1934–2021), New Zealand politician and chief executive
John Pollard Seddon (1827–1906), British architect
John Seddon (Unitarian) (1719–1769), English Unitarian minister
John Seddon of Warrington (1725–1770), English dissenting minister, rector of Warrington Academy